Fear, Anxiety and Depression is a 1989 American comedy film written and directed by Todd Solondz and starring Solondz, Stanley Tucci and Jill Wisoff.

Production
The film was Solondz's first for a major studio, after his work in film school had attracted interest and he had been offered three-picture contracts. He had wanted to title it The Young and the Hopeless and was deeply unhappy with the lack of creative control; he has called it "a painful demoralizing experience", and did not make another film for several years.

Plot
Solondz plays Ira Ellis, a neurotic aspiring playwright in the East Village of Manhattan, whose latest work is titled Despair. The film consists of vignettes featuring equally pretentious and as yet unsuccessful members of the arts scene including Ira's friend, Jack, a painter; his chubby girlfriend Sharon, a mime; his subsequent girlfriend, a performance artist; and Jack's cast-off girlfriend with whom he has a fling, an actress. Meanwhile, an old classmate of Ira's, Donny (played by Stanley Tucci in one of his first roles), has achieved success without apparent effort and takes up with Sharon.

Critical reception
A reviewer for The New York Times called Fear, Anxiety and Depression "an amiable, uninspired spoof of the notion that agony and art go together" that acknowledges its debts to other film makers (such as Woody Allen in Ira's character and mannerisms) but lacking a "distinctive voice or vision". A retrospective review for IFC called it "wan and obvious" satire.

References

External links

1989 films
American independent films
1989 comedy films
Films directed by Todd Solondz
American comedy films
Films about writers
American avant-garde and experimental films
Films shot in New York (state)
Films produced by Steve Golin
The Samuel Goldwyn Company films
1980s avant-garde and experimental films
1989 directorial debut films
1980s English-language films
1980s American films